Peter John Farmer (born 25 June 1952) is an Australian-American hammer thrower and educator.

Born in Sydney, New South Wales, Australia, he moved to El Paso, Texas, USA, in the early 1970s to pursue his academic career at University of Texas at El Paso, where he completed his bachelor's, master's and doctoral degrees. He twice competed at the IAAF World Cup.

He participated in:
 1974 British Commonwealth Games - Bronze Medal
 1976 Summer Olympics
 1978 Commonwealth Games - Gold Medal
 1980 Summer Olympics

In addition, he has held coaching appointments, National Coach of Mexico, Throwing Coach of Norway and at the Australian Institute of Sport. Farmer was also a television sports reporter and international commentator (Network 10 and ABC); and executive director of a non-profit sports and recreation community organization.

Farmer wrote a book on planning and management of sport facilities, andhas  written several book chapters and articles in the areas of risk management, event and facility management, and areas in track and field.

He has resided between the USA (Texas, North Carolina, Louisiana) and Australia.

References

1952 births
Living people
Athletes from Sydney
Australian male hammer throwers
Olympic male hammer throwers
Olympic athletes of Australia
Athletes (track and field) at the 1976 Summer Olympics
Athletes (track and field) at the 1980 Summer Olympics
Commonwealth Games bronze medallists for Australia
Commonwealth Games gold medallists for Australia
Commonwealth Games medallists in athletics
Athletes (track and field) at the 1974 British Commonwealth Games
Athletes (track and field) at the 1978 Commonwealth Games
UTEP Miners men's track and field athletes
Australian emigrants to the United States
Medallists at the 1974 British Commonwealth Games
Medallists at the 1978 Commonwealth Games